The Second Mongol invasion of Hungary led by Nogai Khan and Tulabuga took place during the winter of 1285–1286.

Prelude

The first invasion

In 1241, a Mongol army under Subutai and Batu Khan invaded central and eastern Europe, including Poland, Bulgaria, Croatia, and the Kingdom of Hungary. The Hungarian attempt to halt the invasion at the Battle of Mohi failed catastrophically. The light cavalry that made up most of the Hungarian mounted forces had proven ineffective against the Mongol troops, though the few heavily armored knights (mostly those of the Knights Templar) performed significantly better when engaged in close quarters combat. The Mongols decisively crushed the Hungarian army, and proceeded to ravage the countryside for the next year. By the end of their campaign, around a quarter of the population of Hungary had been killed, and most of the kingdom's major settlements had been reduced to rubble.

The wooden, clay, and earth defenses that made up the walls of most towns and forts fell easily to the Mongol siege engines. Many Hungarian settlements didn't have any fortifications at all. One German chronicler observed that the Hungarians "had almost no city protected by walls or strong fortresses". However, stone castles had significantly better fortunes; none of the few Hungarian stone castles fell, even those deep behind the Mongol lines. When the Mongols tried to use their siege engines on the stone walls of the Croatian Fortress of Klis, they did absolutely no damage, and were repelled with heavy casualties. A similar thing happened when they attempted to capture the citadel of Esztergom, despite having overwhelming numerical superiority and 30 siege machines which they had just used to reduce the wooden towers of the city.

Military reforms

King Béla IV took note of this, and spent the next few decades reforming Hungary in preparation for possible future invasions. He used a variety of methods to do this. First and foremost, he amalgamated the servientes and iobagiones castri into a new class of heavily armored, well-trained knights of the western type, where previously Hungary's defenses had relied almost entirely on wooden castles and light cavalry.Ertman, Thomas. "Birth of the Leviathan: Building States and Regimes in Medieval and Early Modern Europe." Cambridge University Press (January 13, 1997). Page 273. In 1247 he concluded a feudal agreement with the Knights of St. John, giving them the southeastern borderland in exchange for their help in creating more armored cavalry and fortifications. In 1248, he declared the country's middle strata could enter a baron's service, on the condition that the barons lead the men on his land properly equipped (in armor) into the king's army. Documents from the time state that "the nobles of our country can enter into military service of bishops in the same way in which they can serve other nobles". After 1250, free owners of small or middle sized estates serving directly under the king were included (along with barons) in the nobility. Finally, new settlers were given "conditional" nobility in exchange for the requirement of fighting mounted and armored at the king's request. In 1259, he requested that the Pope put him into contact with Venice, as he wanted to hire at least 1,000 crossbowmen (crossbows having also proven a very effective weapon against the Mongols, despite the relatively small numbers of them actually deployed by the Hungarians in 1241).

To cement his new defense doctrine, the king offered grants and rewards to cities and nobles in exchange for the building of stone fortifications. The reforms ultimately paid off. By the end of his reign, Béla IV had overseen the building of nearly 100 new fortresses. Of these 100, 66 were stone castles built on elevated sites. This was a major upgrade from 1241, when the kingdom only possessed 10 stone castles, half of which were placed along the border with the Duchy of Austria.

Lead-up to the second invasion

In 1254, Batu Khan demanded a marriage alliance with Hungary and a quarter of its army for a drive into central and western Europe. In exchange, Hungary would be spared from tribute obligations and any further destruction. Béla ignored the message. Additional ultimatums were sent in 1259 and 1264, this time by Batu's brother and successor, Berke Khan. Berke made similar demands: if Hungary would submit to the Mongols and grant them a quarter of its army for the planned invasion of Europe, it would receive tax exemption and 1/5 of the plunder. Again, Béla refused. Letters exchanged between Béla and the Pope circa 1259 imply that the Mongols had been well known to be untrustworthy for decades, with the Pope saying that any agreements made by the "perfidious" conquerors were worthless.

After the deaths of the kings Béla IV and Stephen V, Ladislaus IV assumed the Hungarian throne in 1272. Under the maternal influence, he became known as the Ladislaus the Cuman. In the next years, his resistance against the nobles and clerics became stronger, to the point that he arrested a papal legate over a law requiring the pagan Cumans convert to Christianity and imprisoned his Christian wife, Isabel of Anjou. The barons raised an army and Lodomer, Archbishop of Esztergom declared a crusade against the Hungarian king. However, when the Cumans rebelled and invaded Hungary in 1282, Ladislaus and his nobles did not hesitate to crush the rebellion. The Illuminated Chronicle writes that Ladislaus, "like the brave Joshua, went out against" the Cumans "to fight for his people and his realm," defeating the Cuman army at Lake Hód, near Hódmezővásárhely.

Despite this, the king's reputation especially among his nobles remained very poor. In 1283 he settled among his Cuman subjects after abandoning his wife, and took Cuman women as his mistresses. The 1282 Cuman rebellion may have catalyzed the Mongol invasion. Cuman warriors driven out of Hungary offered their services to Nogai Khan, de facto head of the Golden Horde, and told him about the perilous political situation in Hungary. Seeing this as an opportunity, Nogai decided to start a vast campaign against the apparently weak kingdom.Salagean, p. 135

Invasion

Forces 
In the winter of 1285, Mongol armies invaded Hungary for a second time. As in the first invasion in 1241, Mongols invaded Hungary in two fronts. Nogai invaded via Transylvania, while Töle-Buka (Talabuga) invaded via Transcarpathia and Moravia. A third, smaller force likely entered the center of the kingdom, mirroring Kadan's earlier route. The invasion paths seemed to mirror those taken by Batu and Subutai 40 years earlier, with Talabuga going through Verecke Pass and Nogai going through Brassó to enter Transylvania.Salagean, p. 135 Much like the first invasion, the Mongols emphasized speed and surprise and intended to destroy the Hungarian forces in detail, invading in winter for hope of catching the Hungarians off guard and moving fast enough that it was impossible (at least until their later setbacks) for Ladislaus to gather enough men to engage them in a decisive confrontation. Because of the lack of civil war in the Mongol Empire at the time, as well as the lack of any other major conflicts involving the Golden Horde, Nogai was able to field a very large army for this invasion, with the Galician-Volhynian Chronicle describing it as "a great host" but its exact size isn't certain. It is known that the Mongol host included cavalry from their vassals, the Ruthenian princes, including Lev Daniilovich and others from among their Rus′ satellites.Jackon, p. 205

Stefan Krakowski indirectly places the Mongol invasion force a fair bit above 30,000 men by estimating the smaller Mongol invasion of Poland two years later as having about that many soldiers, stating that Nogai and Talabuga personally leading an invasion suggests it is a massive force by definition. Peter Jackson, using contemporary Hungarian charters, concludes that the Mongol army was very large, but is unsure if it was larger, smaller, or comparable in size to the 1241–42 invasion force. A contemporary letter from Benedict, the provost of Esztergom, estimates the size of the Mongol army at 200,000. This is almost certainly an enormous exaggeration, as the Mongols almost never fielded armies larger than 100,000 men. The Galician-Volhynian Chronicle puts the size of the Mongol army in the hundreds of thousands, saying that Talabuga's column alone lost 100,000 men during the march through the Carpathians. Such numbers are considered inflated by modern historians.

In 1255, William of Rubruck wrote that the Hungarians could gather at most 30,000 soldiers, a situation that probably hadn't drastically changed in the last three decades.William of Rubruck. "The journey of William of Rubruck to the eastern parts of the world, 1253-55." Translated by  William Woodville Rockhill. Page 281. "It would be very easy to conquer or to pass through all these countries. The King of Hungary has not at most XXX thousand soldiers." It is unknown how many of these men were mustered during the period of the Mongol invasion.

Central/Northern Hungary, Transcarpathia, and Western Transylvania 
Talabuga, who led the main army in Northern Hungary, was stopped by the heavy snow of the Carpathians. On the march up, his force was devastated by logistical factors, namely a shortage of food which caused the deaths of thousands of his soldiers, as attested to by the Galician-Volynian Chronicle and certain contemporary Polish sources. This was likely the result of the traditional tactics of castle warfare, which involve starving out the invaders by hoarding all available food stocks, while launching small raids and sallies from the castles. Polish chroniclers hostile to the Hungarian king stated that Ladislaus was too cowardly to face the Mongols in a straight battle, very likely a misinterpretation of successful battle avoidance and scorched earth tactics. 

At the beginning of the campaign the invading force devastated central Hungary and entered the town of Pest. They burned it, but the town had long since been abandoned by its population, who fled south and west of the Danube. During this event, members of Queen Elizabeth's household launched a spirited and effective sally against the Mongols, while she watched from the safety of the walls of Buda. Talabuga's forces encountered great difficulties with the density of fortifications and failed to capture any castles or fortified cities. However, they caused major damage to the civilian population, and raided as far as the Danube. Local Hungarian forces fought the Mongols in many defensive battles, for which the king had promoted several lesser officials who had distinguished themselves, including George Baksa, Amadeus Aba his relative, Peter Aba from the clan's Somos branch. One such battle took place near the castle of Turusko (Trascău), where the Mongols suffered a sharp defeat with heavy casualties, including 1,000 taken prisoner. Talabuga's weakened army was ultimately defeated when met head-on in battle by the hastily assembled royal army of Ladislaus IV, in the hills of western Transylvania. The army had benefited from the reforms and had a higher proportion of knights than the army the Mongols had defeated a few decades earlier at Mohi.

After the defeat, Talabuga ordered a retreat from Hungary, but his army was ambushed on the return by the Székely people, who fought as light cavalry. By the time he made it back to friendly territory, his army had effectively ceased to exist, with the majority of the soldiers he brought dying in the failed raid. By the hyperbole of one chronicler, Talabuga arrived back in Ruthenia with only his wife and one horse. Once he finally reached  Volynia, his starving soldiers plundered the towns of his allies and vassals.

Transylvania and the Hungarian Plains 
Nogai stayed in Transylvania until the spring of 1286. Here he plundered some towns and villages, such as Szászrégen (Reghin), Brassó (Braşov) and Beszterce (Bistrița). He also managed to destroy a few forts and walled towns. However, like Talabuga, he failed to take any major fortifications, with the exception of the Saxon castle of Ban Mikod in the Aranyos Valley, the former royal stronghold of Torda (today Turda, Romania). After the defeat of Talabuga's main column, King Ladislaus IV led an expedition to expel Nogai's forces from Transylvania. His army arrived too late to make a significant difference, as Nogai's forces had already suffered a serious defeat at the hands of local Hungarian troops--mostly the Saxons, Vlachs, and Székelys, commanded by Voivode Roland Borsa. Ladislaus settled for harassing their withdrawal.

Aftermath
The results of the invasion could not have contrasted more sharply with those of the 1241 invasion. The invasion was repelled handily, and the Mongols lost much of their invading force due to several months of starvation, numerous small raids, and two major military defeats. This was mostly thanks to the new fortification network and the military reforms. No major invasion of Hungary would be launched after the failure of the campaign of 1285, though small raids from the Golden Horde were frequent well into the 14th century. Less than two years later, the Third Mongol invasion of Poland occurred. This invasion was also repulsed, with the Poles using a similar strategy to the Hungarians in 1285. They were aided by a Hungarian force under George Baksa (also known as George of Sóvár). It was probably in reprisal for this event that in late 1288, a Mongol force launched an attack on the Szepes (Spiš) region, albeit on a small scale. They were repelled, with George again distinguishing himself.

While a victory for Hungary overall (albeit with heavy civilian casualties), the war was a political disaster for the king. Like his grandfather before him, many nobles accused him of inviting the Mongols into his lands, due to his perceived ties to the Cumans. Possibly more disastrously, the invasion was fended off by local barons and other magnates with little help from the king. After proving their military skills, the efficiency of their fortifications and armed forces, and their ability to ensure the safety of their subjects to a greater degree than the king or his dignitaries, various local elites expanded their net of supporters and deemed themselves entitled to rule large regions of the kingdom. The crisis brought to light the king's lack of significant military resources and inability to compensate for such via political skills.

The heavy losses suffered by the Mongols in this war, combined with their defeat in Poland shortly after (though they did successfully re-vassalize Bulgaria between these expeditions), contributed to the lack of major Golden Horde operations in central Europe outside of the 1280s. From then on, Mongol attacks on Hungary and Transylvania would be limited to raids and pillaging along the frontier lines.Salagean, 137 By the 14th century, the Golden Horde and much of the Mongolian Empire posed no serious threats thereafter to Hungary, despite frontier raids continuing under Öz Beg Khan. In fact, in 1345, a Hungarian army under Count Andrew Lackfi took the initiative and launched an invasion force into Mongolian territory, defeating a Golden Horde force and capturing what would become Moldavia.

Notes

References
 Chambers, James -- The Devil's Horsemen: The Mongol Invasion of Europe
 Peter F. Sugar, Péter Hanák, Tibor Frank -- A History of Hungary. 1990 Indiana University 448p. 
 Pow, Stephen Lindsay -- Deep Ditches and Well-built walls. Calgary, 2012.https://prism.ucalgary.ca/bitstream/handle/11023/232/ucalgary_2012_pow_lindsey.pdf?sequence=2&isAllowed=y
 Pál Engel, Tamás Pálosfalvi, Andrew Ayton: The Realm of St. Stephen: A History of Medieval Hungary, 895-1526, I.B.Tauris & Co Ltd, London. 2001. 471.p
 Stefan Krakowski -- Polska w walce z najazdami tatarskimi w XIII wieku, Wyd. 1956
 Jackson, Peter -- The Mongols and the West: 1221–1410. 2005 Routledge, 448p 
 Z. J. Kosztolnyik -- Hungary in the 13th Century, East European Monographs, 1996
 Salagean, Tudor. Transylvania in the Second Half of the Thirteenth Century: The Rise of the Congregation System Brill, 2016, pages 134-138
 
 

Hungary
Conflicts in 1285
Conflicts in 1286
1285 in Europe
1286 in Europe
Wars involving Hungary
Hungary
Hungary